Jinzhouwan Airport may refer to:

 Jinzhou Bay Airport, serving Jinzhou, Liaoning, China
 Dalian Jinzhouwan International Airport, serving Dalian, Liaoning, China